Sarwata was the tenth Chief Justice of the Supreme Court of Indonesia. Sarwata led an investigation by the Supreme Court into allegations of its own wrongdoing in 1996, during which his panel found no evidence of such wrongdoing. His promotion as Chief Justice thereafter was seen as a victory for the Court's old elite. He was the first Chief Justice of Indonesia to be openly accused of corruption.

Sarwata has been described as the last bastion of military men in the Indonesian judiciary before the Post-Suharto era. He was disdainful of civilian institutions, rarely actually showed up for work at the Supreme Court, displayed little knowledge of legal issues and made a habit of dodging official visitors to his office.

References

Chief justices of the Supreme Court of Indonesia
1935 births
2003 deaths